Oklahoma City's Adventure District is an area in Oklahoma City, roughly centered on NE 50th Street and Martin Luther King Avenue, that is home to several of the city's best-known attractions. The "Adventure District" designation was created in 2000 as a marketing effort by several of the area's businesses to market the area.

In 2003, the City of Oklahoma City recognized the area as an official entertainment district.

Attractions 
45th Infantry Division Museum
Oklahoma City Zoological Park
Science Museum Oklahoma
OmniDome Theatre
National Softball Hall of Fame and Museum
Oklahoma State Firefighters Museum
Lincoln Park
Frontier City
National Cowboy and Western Heritage Museum
Remington Park
Cinemark Tinseltown USA movie theater
Coles Garden

References

External links
Official website

Neighborhoods in Oklahoma City